Anzia Yezierska (October 29, 1880 – November 20, 1970) was a Jewish-American novelist born in Mały Płock, Poland, which was then part of the Russian Empire. She emigrated as a child with her parents to the United States and lived in the immigrant neighborhood of the Lower East Side of Manhattan.

Personal life 
Yezierska was born in the 1880s in Mały Płock to Bernard and Pearl Yezierski. Her family emigrated to America around 1893, following in the footsteps of her eldest brother, who had arrived in the States six years prior. They took up housing in the Lower East Side, Manhattan. Her family assumed the surname, Mayer, while Anzia took Harriet (or Hattie) as her first name. She later reclaimed her original name, Anzia Yezierska, in her late twenties.  Her father was a scholar of Torah and sacred texts.

Anzia Yezierska's parents encouraged her brothers to pursue higher education but believed she and her sisters had to support the men.

In 1910 she fell in love with Arnold Levitas but instead married his friend Jacob Gordon, a New York attorney. After 6 months, the marriage was annulled. Shortly after, she married Arnold Levitas in a religious ceremony to avoid legal complications. Arnold was the father of her only child, Louise, born May 29, 1912.

Around 1914 Yezierska left Levitas and moved with her daughter to San Francisco. She worked as a social worker. Overwhelmed with the chores and responsibilities of raising her daughter, she gave up her maternal rights and transferred them to Levitas. In 1916, she and Levitas officially divorced.

She then moved back to New York City. Around 1917, she engaged in a romantic relationship with philosopher John Dewey, a professor at Columbia University. Both Dewey and Yezierska wrote about one another, alluding to the relationship.

After she had become independent, her sister encouraged her to pursue her interest in writing. She devoted the remainder of her life to it.

Yezierska was the aunt of American film critic Cecelia Ager. Ager's daughter became known as journalist Shana Alexander.

Anzia Yezierska died November 21, 1970, of a stroke in a nursing home in Ontario, California.

Writing career 
Yezierska wrote about the struggles of Jewish and later Puerto Rican immigrants in New York's Lower East Side. In her fifty-year writing career, she explored the cost of acculturation and assimilation among immigrants. Her stories provide insight into the meaning of liberation for immigrants—particularly Jewish immigrant women.  Many of her works of fiction can be labeled semi-autobiographical.  In her writing, she drew from her life growing up as an immigrant in New York's Lower East Side.  Her works feature elements of realism with attention to detail; she often has characters express themselves in Yiddish-English dialect. Her sentimentalism and highly idealized characters have prompted some critics to classify her works as romantic.

Yezierska turned to writing around 1912. Turmoil in her personal life prompted her to write stories focused on problems faced by wives. In the beginning, she had difficulty finding a publisher for her work. But her persistence paid off in December 1915 when her story, "The Free Vacation House" was published in The Forum. She attracted more critical attention about a year later when another tale, "Where Lovers Dream" appeared in Metropolitan. Her literary endeavors received more recognition when her rags-to-riches story, "The Fat of the Land," appeared in noted editor Edward J. O'Brien's collection, Best Short Stories of 1919. Yezierska's early fiction was eventually collected by publisher Houghton Mifflin and released as a book titled Hungry Hearts in 1920.  Another collection of stories, Children of Loneliness, followed two years later. These stories focus on the children of immigrants and their pursuit of the American Dream.

Some literary critics argue that Yezierska's strength as an author was best found in her novels. Her first novel, Salome of the Tenements (1923), was inspired by her friend Rose Pastor Stokes. Stokes gained fame as a young immigrant woman when she married a wealthy young man of a prominent Episcopalian New York family in 1904.

Her most studied work is Bread Givers (1925). It explores the life of a young Jewish-American immigrant woman struggling to live from day to day while searching to find her place in American society. Bread Givers remains her best known novel.

Arrogant Beggar chronicles the adventures of narrator Adele Lindner. She exposes the hypocrisy of the charitably run Hellman Home for Working Girls after fleeing from the poverty of the Lower East Side.

In 1929–1930 Yezierska received a Zona Gale fellowship at the University of Wisconsin, which gave her a financial stipend. She wrote several stories and finished a novel while serving as a fellow. She published All I Could Never Be (1932) after returning to New York City.

The end of the 1920s marked a decline of interest in Yezierska's work. During the Great Depression, she worked for the Federal Writers Project of the Works Progress Administration. During this time, she wrote the novel, All I Could Never Be. Published in 1932, this work was inspired by her own struggles. As portrayed in the book, she identified as an immigrant and never felt truly American, believing native-born people had an easier time. It was the last novel Yezierska published before falling into obscurity.

Her fictionalized autobiography, Red Ribbon on a White Horse (1950), was published when she was nearly 70 years old. This revived interest in her work, as did the trend in the 1960s and 1970s to study literature by women. "The Open Cage" is one of Yezierska's bleakest stories, written during her later years of life. She began writing it in 1962 at the age of 81. It compares the life of an old woman to that of an ailing bird.

Although she was nearly blind, Yezierska continued writing. She had stories, articles, and book reviews published until her death in California in 1970.

Yezierska and Hollywood 
The success of Anzia Yezierska's early short stories led to a brief, but significant, relationship between the author and Hollywood. Movie producer Samuel Goldwyn bought the rights to Yezierska's collection Hungry Hearts.  The silent film of the same title (1922) was shot on location at New York's Lower East Side with Helen Ferguson, E. Alyn Warren, and Bryant Washburn. In recent years, the film was restored through the efforts of the National Center for Jewish Film, the Samuel Goldwyn Company, and the British Film Institute; in 2006, a new score was composed to accompany it. The San Francisco Jewish Film Festival showed the restored print in July 2010. Yezierska's 1923 novel Salome of the Tenements was adapted and produced as a silent film of the same title (1925).

Recognizing the popularity of Yezierska's stories, Goldwyn gave the author a $100,000 contract to write screenplays. In California, her success led her to be called by publicists, "the sweatshop Cinderella." She was uncomfortable with being touted as an example of the American Dream. Frustrated by the shallowness of Hollywood and by her own alienation, Yezierska returned to New York in the mid-1920s. She continued publishing novels and stories about immigrant women struggling to establish their identities in America.

Works by Anzia Yezierska

 We Go Forth All To See America – A Vignette (Judaica, Jewish Literature) (1920)
 Hungry Hearts (short stories, 1920) 
 The Lost Beautifulness (1922)
 Salome of the Tenements 
 Children of Loneliness (short stories, 1923) 
 Bread Givers: a struggle between a father of the Old World and a daughter of the New (novel, 1925) 
 Arrogant Beggar (novel, 1927) 
 All I Could Never Be (novel, 1932) 
 The Open Cage: An Anzia Yezierska Collection edited by Alice Kessler Harris (New York: Persea Books, 1979) .
 Red Ribbon on a White Horse: My Story (autobiographical novel, 1950)
 How I Found America: Collected Stories (short stories, 1991)

Bibliography 
 "Anzia Yezierska". In Dictionary of Literary Biography, Volume 221:American Women Prose Writers, 1870–1920. A Bruccoli Clark Layman Book. Edited by Sharon M. Harris, University of Nebraska, Lincoln. The Gale Group, 2000, p. 381–7.
 "Anzia Yezierska". In Dictionary of Literary Biography, Volume 28: Twentieth-Century American-Jewish Fiction Writers. A Bruccoli Clark Layman Book. Edited by Daniel Walden, Pennsylvania State University. The Gale Group, 1984, p. 332–5.
 "Anzia Yezierska."  Jewish American Literature: A Norton Anthology.  October 24, 2007 
 Berch, Bettina. From Hester Street to Hollywood:  The Life and Work of Anzia Yezierska.  Sefer International, 2009.
 Bergland, Betty Ann.  “Dissidentification and Dislocation: Anzia Yerzierska’s on a white horse.” Reconstructing the ‘Self’ in America:  Patterns in Immigrant Women’s Autobiography.  Ph.D. diss., University of Minnesota, 1990, 169244
 Boydston, Jo Ann, ed.  The Poems of John Dewey.  Carbondale:  Southern Illinois University Press, 1977.
 Cane, Aleta. "Anzia Yezierska." American Women Writers, 1900–1945: A Bio-Bibliographical Critical Source Book. Ed. Laurie Champion. Westport, Connecticut: Greenwood Press, 2000.
 Dearborn, Mary V .  "Anzia Yezierska and the Making of an Ethnic American Self." In The Invention of Ethnicity.  Ed.  Werner Solors.  New York: Oxford University Press, 1980, 105–123.
 --.  Love in the Promised Land:  The Story of Anzia Yezierska and John Dewey.  New York:  Free Press, 1988.
 --.  Pocahontas’s Daughters: Gender and Ethnicity in American Culture.  New York Oxford University press, 1986.
 Drucker, Sally Ann. "Yiddish, Yidgin, and Yezierska:  Dialect in Jewish-American Writing."  Yiddish 6.4 (1987):  99–113.
 Ferraro, Thomas J. “’Working Ourselves Up’ in America:  Anzia Yezierska’s Bread Givers.”  South Atlantic Quarterly 89:3  (summer 1990), 547–581.
 Gelfant, Blanche H.  “Sister to Faust:  The City’s ‘Hungry’ Woman as Heroine.”  In Women Writing in America:  Voices in Collage.  Hanover, N.H.: University Press of New England, 1984, 203–224.
 Goldsmith, Meredith. "Dressing, Passing, and Americanizing:  Anzia Yezierska's Sartorial Fictions." Studies in American Jewish Literature 16 (1997): 34–45. [End Page 435]
 Henriksen, Louise Levitas.  Anzia Yezierska:  A Writer’s Life.  New Brunswick, N.J:  Rutgers University Press, 1988.
 Henriksen, Louise Levitas. "Afterword About Anzia Yezierska." In The Open Cage: An Anzia Yezierska Collection. New York: Persea Books, 1979, 253–62.
 Horowitz, Sara R.. "Anzia Yezierska." Jewish Women: A Comprehensive Historical Encyclopedia. 20 March 2009. Jewish Women's Archive.
 Inglehart, Babbette. "Daughters of Loneliness: Anzia Yezierska and the Immigrant Woman Writer." Studies in American Jewish Literature, 1 (Winter 1975): 1–10.
 Japtok, Martin. "Justifying Individualism:  Anzia Yezierska's Bread Givers." The Immigrant Experience in North American Literature:  Carving out a Niche.  Ed.  Katherine B.--Rose Payant, Toby (ed. and epilogue).  Contributions to the Study of American Literature.  Westport, CT: Greenwood, 1999.  17–30.
 Konzett, Delia Caparoso.  "Administered Identities and Linguistic Assimilation:  The Politics of Immigrant English in Anzia Yezierska's Hungry Hearts." American Literature 69 (1997): 595–619.
 Levin, Tobe. "Anzia Yezierska." Jewish American Women Writers: A Bio-Bibliographical Critical Source Book. Ed. Ann Shapiro. Westport, Connecticut: Greenwood Press, 1994.
 Schoen, Carol B.  Anzia Yezierska.  Boston:  Twayne, 1982.
 Stinson, Peggy. Anzia Yezierska. Ed. Lina Mainiero. Vol. 4. New York: Frederick Ungar Publishing Co., 1982.
 Stubbs, Katherine.  "Reading Material:  Contextualizing Clothing in the Work of Anzia Yezierska."  MELUS 23.2 (1998): 157–72.
 Taylor, David. Soul of a People: The WPA Writers' Project Uncovers Depression America. New Jersey: Wiley & Sons, 2009.
 Wexler, Laura.  “Looking at Yezierska.”  In Women of the World:  Jewish Women and Jewish Writing.  Ed. Judith R. Baskin. Detroit:  Wayne State University Press, 1994, 153–181.
 Wilentz, Gay. "Cultural Mediation and the Immigrant's Daughter: Anzia Yezierska's Bread Givers." MELSUS, 17, NO. 3(1991–1992): 33–41.
 Zaborowska, Magdalena J.  “Beyond the Happy Endings:  Anzia Yezierska Rewrites the New World Woman.”  In How we Found America:  Reading Gender through East European Immigrant Narratives.  Chapel Hill:  University of North Carolina Press,  1995, 113–164.

References

External links

Works

Biography 
 Sara R. Horowitz, Anzia Yezierska, Jewish Women Encyclopedia
 Short Biography
 Jewish Virtual Library Anzia Yezierska
 Biography of Anzia Yezierska
 American Passages

Others 
 Anzia Yezierska at the Women Film Pioneers Project
 undergraduate paper on (amongst others) Yezierska's The Fat of the Land
 Hungry Hearts Credits
 Study guide at Georgetown
 In America, a female sweatshop worker from a Polish shtetl could become a renowned writer and Hollywood commodity
 A Women Make Movies Documentary on Anzia Yezierska: Sweatshop Cinderella
 Valerie-Kristin Piehslinger: Portrayals of Urban Jewish Communities in U.S. American and Canadian Immigrant Fiction in Selected Texts by Anzia Yezierska and Adele Wiseman. AV Akademikerverlag, Saarbrücken 2013  

20th-century American novelists
American people of Polish-Jewish descent
American women novelists
20th-century American memoirists
Jewish women writers
1880 births
1970 deaths
Works Progress Administration workers
Jewish American novelists
Congress Poland emigrants to the United States
American women memoirists
20th-century American women writers
Women film pioneers
Federal Writers' Project people